Vinícius Rangel Costa (born 26 May 2001) is a Brazilian road cyclist, who currently rides for UCI WorldTeam .

He began cycling around the age of 13 when encouraged to take up the sport by a cousin.

Major results

2018
 National Junior Road Championships
2nd Road race
2nd Time trial
 4th Time trial, Pan American Junior Road Championships
2019
 Pan American Junior Road Championships
3rd  Road race
3rd  Time trial
2021
 1st Overall Vuelta a Cantabria
 1st Overall 
1st Stages 2 & 3
 9th Road race, UCI World Under-23 Road Championships
2022
 National Road Championships
1st  Road race
3rd Time trial
 1st  Time trial, National Under-23 Road Championships

References

External links

2001 births
Living people
Brazilian male cyclists
Brazilian road racing cyclists
People from Cabo Frio